Nikolskoye 2-ye is a rural locality (a selo) in Nikolskoye 1-ye Rural Settlement, Vorobyovsky District, Voronezh Oblast, Russia. The population was 583 as of 2010. There are 13 streets.

Geography 
Nikolskoye 2-ye is located 21 km southeast of Vorobyovka (the district's administrative centre) by road. Nikolskoye 1-ye is the nearest rural locality.

References 

Rural localities in Vorobyovsky District